Ajjikuttira Somaiah Bopanna (born 20 May 1959) is a judge of Supreme Court of India. He is former chief justice of the Gauhati High Court. He is also former judge of Karnataka High Court.

References

1959 births
Living people
21st-century Indian judges
Chief Justices of the Gauhati High Court
Judges of the Karnataka High Court
Justices of the Supreme Court of India
People from Kodagu district